Miguel Ligero Rodríguez (21 October 1890 – 26 January 1968) was a Spanish actor. Films include La hermana San Sulpicio (1934), El novio de mamá (1934), Nobleza baturra (1935) Morena Clara (1936), El rey de las finanzas (1944), Morena Clara (1954) and La verbena de la Paloma (1963). He also had several roles as a character actor in Hollywood Spanish-language films.

Selected filmography
 World Crisis (1934)
 Sister San Sulpicio (1934)
 Bound for Cairo (1935)
 The Barber of Seville (1938)
 The Reluctant Hero (1941)
 Malvaloca (1954)
 La cruz de mayo (1955)
 The Moorish Queen (1955)
 Fountain of Trevi (1960)
 Queen of The Chantecler (1962)
 The Fair of the Dove (1963)
 Aragonese Nobility (1965)

References

External links 
 

Spanish male film actors
1890 births
1968 deaths
Male actors from Madrid